Lieutenant General Giles Stibbert (1734–1809) was Commander-in-Chief, India.

Military career
Stibber arrived in India in 1756 and took part in the Battle of Plassey in 1757. He then raised a battalion of native infantry at Bankipore in 1761 and commanded them at the Siege of Patna where he was wounded in 1763. He commanded the left wing of the Army at the Battle of Buxar in 1764 and captured Chunar in 1765.

He was twice Commander-in-Chief, India, firstly from 1777 to 1779 and then again from 1783, following the death of Sir Eyre Coote, to 1785. With his wealth, plundered during his service in India, he built the first Portswood House at Portswood in Hampshire in 1778. His grandson, Frederick Stibbert, used the family's wealth to establish the Stibbert museum in Florence.

He is buried in South Stoneham in Hampshire with a monument by John Bacon.

Family
He was married to Sophronia Rebecca Wright.

References

|-

British Commanders-in-Chief of India
1734 births
1809 deaths
British East India Company Army generals
People from South Stoneham